Jackson Galaxy (born April 28, 1966, as Richard Kirschner) is an American cat behaviorist, YouTuber, and the host of the television show My Cat from Hell.

Early life
Jackson Galaxy was born Richard Kirschner, on April 28, 1966 to a Jewish refugee father and 19-year-old mother in Manhattan, New York City, New York, and was raised on Manhattan's Upper West Side. At age ten, he began playing the guitar, aspiring to be a professional rock musician.

Galaxy graduated from the University of Iowa in 1991 with a theater degree.

Career
Galaxy moved to Boulder, Colorado, in 1992 and was a rock musician. He learned cat behavior through his work with rescue cats, originally with the Humane Society of Boulder Valley. After working there and at other animal shelters, he went into private practice as a cat consultant in 2002, co-founding Little Big Cat, Inc., with Dr. Jean Hofve, a holistic veterinarian. Together they provided consultations to cat owners, focusing on the connection between physical and behavioral health.

In 2007, Galaxy moved to Los Angeles, where he re-established a private consulting practice.

Galaxy works with animal shelters and rescue organizations, teaching his "Cat Mojo" approach to feline behavior to volunteers, staff and adopters.

He serves on the board of directors for Stray Cat Alliance and Fix Nation in Los Angeles as well as the Board of Advisers for Neighborhood Cats in New York City.

Galaxy has appeared as the official cat behaviorist for Game Show Network's Think Like a Cat and as the cat behavior expert on Animal Planet's Cats 101.

Since May 2011, Galaxy has starred in My Cat From Hell, a reality TV series produced by Animal Planet in which he helps cat guardians—often couples—resolve conflict and behavioral issues between them and their cats. Since December 2013, he has been host of the web series Cat Mojo on the Animalist Network, where he shares his thoughts on cat-related issues like declawing, use of squirt guns and behind-the-scenes stories.

Galaxy is the author of books about cats and a process called "catification" involving creating cat-friendly spaces within a home. In 2012 he published the autobiographical Cat Daddy: What the World's Most Incorrigible Cat Taught Me About Life, Love, and Coming Clean.

Personal life
Galaxy married Minoo Rahbar at the no-kill pet sanctuary of Best Friends Animal Society in Kanab, Utah, on June 28, 2014. Their dog, Mooshka, served as ringbearer.

Galaxy is a recovered addict of alcohol and drugs. 

After his weight reached  and suffering several health problems, Galaxy underwent gastric bypass surgery in 2007. He maintains a vegan diet.

Publications
 with Joel Derfner: Cat Daddy: What the World's Most Incorrigible Cat Taught Me About Life, Love, and Coming Clean. New York: Tarcher/Penguin, 2012 .
 with Kate Benjamin: Catification: Designing a Happy and Stylish Home for Your Cat (and You!). New York: Tarcher/Penguin, 2014 .
 with Kate Benjamin: Catify to Satisfy: Simple Solutions for Creating a Cat-Friendly Home. New York: Tarcher/Penguin, 2015 .
 with Mikel Delgado: Total Cat Mojo: The Ultimate Guide to Life with Your Cat. New York: Tarcher/Penguin, 2017 .

References

External links
 

Television personalities from New York City
Cat behaviorists
1966 births
Living people
People from Manhattan
American people of Jewish descent